Khan Shaykhun, sometimes spelled Khan Sheikhoun or Khan Shikhoun, is a town in the Maarrat al-Nu'man District, within the southern Idlib Governorate of northwestern Syria.

Khan Shaykhun is located at an altitude of 350 meters on the main highway between Aleppo and Damascus. The local economy is primarily agricultural, focusing on the growing of cotton and cereals. The town was formerly known for producing embroidery. Nearby localities include Hbit to the west, Kafr Zita to southwest, Murak to the south and Al-Tamanah to the east. In 2004, it was recorded as having 34,371 inhabitants.

History

Khan Shaykhun takes its name from a 14th-century khan or caravanserai built by the Mamluk emir Sayf al-Din Shaykhu al-'Umari. The town grew up around the khan and is situated below a prominent tell, where excavations carried out in 1930 under the French Comte du Mesnil du Buisson revealed evidence of habitation dating back to the 20th century BC. The tell, which measures about 200–250 m long by 18–24 m high, was levelled off in the Bronze and Iron Ages to provide a platform for a series of walled towns built successively on top of each other. The second of these, dating to about 700 BC, has been identified as the Assyrian town of Ashkhani. The site was abandoned around 300 BC.

In more recent times, Khan Shaykhun was noted for its beehive houses, an architectural style found across the Levant and probably exported from there to North Africa. It was described in 1902 by the traveller Henry James Ross as "a miserable looking village" and remained small until relatively recently. In 1966 it was recorded as having only around 3,000 inhabitants.

Syrian Civil War
During the Syrian Civil War, the town initially fell under control of the Syrian opposition, and later, in 2014 fell to Jabhat al-Nusra. In 2017, Deutsche Welle reported: "Idlib province, where Khan Sheikhun is located, is mostly controlled by the Tahrir al-Sham alliance, which is dominated by the Fateh al-Sham Front, formerly known as the al-Qaeda affiliated al-Nusra Front."

On 4 April 2017, the town came under a heavy air attack, using chemical weapons. 92 people were killed and several hundred injured. After a few months of relative calm, the town was bombed again in September 2017. Jets believed to belong to the Russian Air Force destroyed the town's power plant, which feeds northern Hama and southern Idlib. The al-Rahma clinic was also struck.

On 27 February 2018, pro-government media reported that Tahrir al-Sham withdrew from the city of Khan Shaykhun, and was expelled from western Aleppo by other rebel groups. In mid-April 2018, pro-opposition media reported that Tahrir al-Sham once again seized the town, which had been devoid of rebel military presence. In August 2018, the town again came under aerial bombardment by pro-government forces. By 2019, almost all of the town's residents had abandoned it.

On 19 August 2019, the Syrian Army was reported to have taken control of the city's eastern and northern districts. The next day, the Syrian Observatory for Human Rights reported that rebel and Islamic factions and jihadi groups withdrew from Khan Shaykhun completely. On 21 August, the Syrian army fully secured the town after capturing the strategic hill of Tell al-Tara and Al-Khazanat Camp in southern Idlib.

External links
Photoblog: Syria's Khan Sheikhoun residents mark anniversary of deadly sarin attack, Al-Araby

References

Towns in Syria
Populated places in Maarat al-Numan District